Peñitas refers to:
Peñitas, Texas
Las Peñitas, Nicaragua